Stenoma pertinax is a moth of the family Depressariidae. It is found in Peru.

The wingspan is about 17 mm. The forewings are light ochreous with a dark purple-fuscous irregular blotch on the base of the costa, reaching nearly half across the wing. There is a dark purple-fuscous spot on the costa before the middle. The plical stigma is very small and dark fuscous, the second discal is rather large and quadrate and there is a broad rather dark purple-fuscous terminal fascia, anterior edge running from five-sixths of the costa to two-thirds of the dorsum, with a projection above the middle where a train of several indistinct dots of dark fuscous irroration runs to the costal spot, and a convex-prominent on the lower third so as to touch the second discal stigma beneath, including a suffused pale ochreous streak along the upper part of termen, and marked on the termen with five or six rather large blackish dots. The hindwings are dark fuscous.

References

Moths described in 1915
Taxa named by Edward Meyrick
Stenoma